The volatility tax is a mathematical finance term, formalized by hedge fund manager Mark Spitznagel, describing the effect of large investment losses (or volatility) on compound returns. It has also been called volatility drag, volatility decay or variance drain.  This is not literally a tax in the sense of a levy imposed by a government, but the mathematical difference between geometric averages compared to arithmetic averages. This difference resembles a tax due to the mathematics which impose a lower compound return when returns vary over time, compared to a simple sum of returns.  This diminishment of returns is in increasing proportion to volatility, such that volatility itself appears to be the basis of a progressive tax. Conversely, fixed-return investments (which have no return volatility) appear to be "volatility tax free".

Overview
As Spitznagel wrote:

Quantitatively, the volatility tax is the difference between the arithmetic and geometric average (or “ensemble average” and “time average”) returns of an asset or portfolio. It thus represents the degree of “non-ergodicity” of the geometric average.

Standard quantitative finance assumes that a portfolio’s net asset value changes follow a geometric Brownian motion (and thus are log-normally distributed) with arithmetic average return (or “drift”) , standard deviation (or “volatility”) , and geometric average return

So the geometric average return is the difference between the arithmetic average return and a function of volatility. This function of volatility

represents the volatility tax. (Though this formula is under the assumption of log-normality, the volatility tax provides an accurate approximation for most return distributions. The precise formula is a function of the central moments of the return distribution.)

The mathematics behind the volatility tax is such that a very large portfolio loss has a disproportionate impact on the volatility tax that it pays and, as Spitznagel wrote, this is why the most effective risk mitigation focuses on large losses:

According to Spitznagel, the goal of risk mitigation strategies is to solve this “vexing non-ergodicity, volatility tax problem” and thus raise a portfolio’s geometric average return, or CAGR, by lowering its volatility tax (and “narrow the gap between our ensemble and time averages”). This is “the very name of the game in successful investing. It is the key to the kingdom, and explains in a nutshell Warren Buffett’s cardinal rule, ‘Don’t lose money.’” Moreover, “the good news is the entire hedge fund industry basically exists to help with this—to help save on volatility taxes paid by portfolios. The bad news is they haven't done that, not at all.”

As Nassim Nicholas Taleb wrote in his 2018 book Skin in the Game, “more than two decades ago, practitioners such as Mark Spitznagel and myself built our entire business careers around the effect of the difference between ensemble and time.”

See also 
 Annual growth %
 Arithmetic mean
 Compound interest
 Ecological fallacy (Averages do not predict individual performance)
 Exponential growth
 Geometric Brownian motion
 Geometric mean
 Log-normal distribution
 Mathematical finance
 Rate of return

References

Interest
Mathematical finance
Exponentials
Risk management